Palamuthi is a village in the Pattukkottai taluk of Thanjavur district, Tamil Nadu, India.

The primary school goes up to 5th standard and the government high school goes up to 10th standard class.

Demographics 

As per the 2001 census, Palamuthi had a total population of 1226 with 581 males and 645 females. The sex ratio was 1110. The literacy rate was 67.54.

References 

 

Villages in Thanjavur district